The PSL Referee of the Season in South African football is awarded to the most outstanding referee of the season.

See also

Premier Soccer League trophies and awards